Mountain View High School is a 4-year public high school in the El Monte Union High School District, in the city of El Monte, California, United States. It was established in 1971 along the city's eastern boundary.

The attendance boundaries of the school roughly consist of Lambert Ave. to the North, Peck Rd. and Mountain View Rd. to the West, Rush St. to the South, and the San Gabriel River to the East.

The school's extensive campus is located on a slope adjacent to the San Gabriel River and features large grassy lawns, brick facades on all of its buildings, and a clear line of sight towards the San Gabriel Mountains, which the school derives its name from.

Mission At Mountain View 
Mountain View High School students will be self-directed learners and powerful communicators who possess the knowledge and skills necessary for achieving college and career readiness. Mountain View High School engages students in a relevant and rigorous curriculum to ensure that all students have an equal opportunity to achieve post-secondary success.

History 
On 31 January 2013, a fire, reported at about 2:30 am, burned down the cafeteria building which also housed the student store, commission room for the associated student body, activities office, and maintenance garage.

New Cafeteria 
Hundreds of El Monte Union students, staff, alumni and community members gathered at Mountain View High School on Jan. 23 to celebrate the grand opening of the Bobby Salcedo Student Union – named in honor of former student, beloved teacher and successful administrator Agustin Roberto “Bobby” Salcedo.
The festive celebration included a ribbon-cutting and name unveiling ceremony of the 30,000-square-foot facility, which will house the school's much-anticipated cafeteria and kitchen, as well as a multipurpose room, Associated Student Body (ASB) meeting spaces and a student store. Mountain View's former cafeteria was destroyed by fire in January 2013.

Band and colorguard

References

External links 
 
High schools in Los Angeles County, California
Public high schools in California
El Monte, California
Educational institutions established in 1971
1971 establishments in California